Penny is an unincorporated community in Pike County, Kentucky, United States. Their post office is closed.

References

Unincorporated communities in Pike County, Kentucky
Unincorporated communities in Kentucky